James Joseph Bell (July 1, 1845 – June 1, 1901) was a United States Army soldier who received the Medal of Honor during the Indian Wars. His name is sometimes incorrectly given as James M. Bell.

Early years
James Bell was born in County Antrim, Ireland, in June 1845 (his gravestone says July 1, 1845). He came to the U.S. in 1866, working initially as a laborer. On July 9, 1870, he enlisted in the U.S. Army and was assigned to Company E Seventh Infantry. He reenlisted five years later.

The Great Sioux War of 1876-77
In March 1876, Company E Seventh Infantry, commanded by Captain Walter Clifford, departed their station at Camp Baker, Montana, to join General John Gibbon in preparation to launching against the Lakota and Northern Cheyenne who had refused to come into the reservations. The company arrived at Fort Ellis near Bozeman where other troops were gathering. In April, the column departed, heading east along the Yellowstone River and finally meeting up with General Alfred Terry's column in early June. After Lieutenant Colonel George Custer's column broke off heading up the Rosebud, the Terry-Gibbon column marched up the Yellowstone and then turned up the Rosebud River. They arrived at the tragic scene of the Battle of the Little Bighorn two days after Custer and his men had lost their lives.

On July 9, 1876, General Terry called for volunteers to carry a message to General George Crook about the Custer disaster and to offering to coordinate their columns against the Indians, who responded violently to attempts to forced relocation and attacks from Americans. To accomplish this dangerous mission of attacking Indians in their home land, three privates from Captain Clifford's company volunteered to carry the message: Bell, William Evans, and Benjamin F. Stewart. It took the soldiers three days to make their way to General Crook's camp near present-day Sheridan, Wyoming. For their bravery, all three soldiers were awarded the Medal of Honor on December 2, 1876. The citation reads "Carried dispatches to Gen. Crook at the imminent risk of his life."

Later life

Private Bell was promoted to sergeant and spent the remainder of his professional life in the Army, serving eight enlistments in all. He was married in 1888 and had one son, born at Fort Logan in 1897. Bell returned to Chicago, where he died on July 1, 1901. He was buried in the Mount Olivet Cemetery in Chicago.

See also

List of Medal of Honor recipients
List of Medal of Honor recipients for the Indian Wars

Note
Private Bell should not to be confused with two-time Medal of Honor recipient James Franklin Bell, who later obtained the rank of major general or with Sergeant James B. Bell of the 11th Ohio Infantry, who was awarded his medal during the Civil War

References

1845 births
1901 deaths
Military personnel from County Antrim
Irish emigrants to the United States (before 1923)
American people of the Indian Wars
United States Army Medal of Honor recipients
19th-century Irish people
Irish soldiers in the United States Army
United States Army non-commissioned officers
Irish-born Medal of Honor recipients
American Indian Wars recipients of the Medal of Honor